The Royal Solomon Islands Police Force (RSIPF) is the national police force of Solomon Islands and in January 2015 had an establishment of approximately 1,153 officers and 43 police stations across the country.

Solomon Islands has no military organisation with this provided in the past by the abolished paramilitary wing of the RSIPF known as the Police Field Force (later Special Task and Rescue). The Regional Assistance Mission to Solomon Islands (RAMSI) withdrew in June 2017 handing full control of policing back to the RSIPF.

History
 1893- The British Solomon Islands Protectorate was established and in 1899 encompassed the German Solomon Islands.
 1922- Protectorate constabulary strength increased to 153 officers by 1922.
 1940- During the war, most police became Coastwatchers including the heroic Jacob C. Vouza
 1945- The armed Constabulary was reconstituted following the war.
 1950- The police band was formed 
 1954- A Queen's Regulation issued renamed the force as the Solomon Islands Police Force - approved establishment was eight commissioned officers and 200 sub-officers and constables.
 1974- All police stations were linked by a radio network.
 1975- John Holloway is appointed the first RSIPF Commissioner of Police in July 1975.  He served as commissioner until 1982.
 1978- ‘Royal’ was added to the title of the police force.
 2003- Between 1998 and 2003 unresolved land issues lead to significant civil conflict, the tensions, and a major break-down of law and order.  On the request of the Governor-General, an international response was organised, the Regional Assistance Mission to Solomon Islands (RAMSI), led by Australia, which restored peace arriving on the 24 July 2003. The RSIPF was disarmed following the ethnic conflict, and RAMSI temporarily provided the armed policing and response capability. RAMSI subsequently rebuilt local capacity in the areas of police, corrections and justice and gradually transferred its powers to local authorities.
 2013- The Military Component of RAMSI (Combined Task Force-CTF) withdrew in mid 2013 and by January 2015 the police component of RAMSI had reduced to approximately 152 officers.
 2014- Following Cyclone Ita RSIPF provided a lead response where an estimated 52,000 people were affected by floods and 23 people tragically lost their lives. Initially over 10,000 people were displaced and relocated in 30 evacuation centres, largely in Honiara. Approximately 2,000 people required longer-term assistance as a result of lost or severely damaged homes.
 2015- Efforts underway to rearm the RSIPF.

Structure

The RSIPF is headed by the Commissioner for Police who report to the Minister of Police, National Security, Correctional Services.  Historically, several Commissioners have been expatriates under contract.  On 22 December 2006, an Australian Federal Police officer, Shane Castles,  then serving as the Commissioner under a contract funded by the Australian government was declared by the Solomon Islands Government to be an "undesirable immigrant" while he was out of the country and was not allowed to return.

The RSIPF structure includes two Deputy Commissioners.  The Deputy Commissioner Operations manages the portfolios of 'National Capital and Crime Prevention' and 'Provincial Policing', both of which are supervised by Assistant Commissioners.  The Deputy Commissioner National Security and Operations Support managed the portfolios of 'National Operations' and 'Corporate Support', again both of which are supervised by Assistant Commissioners.

The RSIPF Police Media Unit reports directly to the Chief of Staff.  The RSIPF website, www.rsipf.gov.sb, was launched on 14 August 2015 and provides a range of information on RSIPF structure and units, as well as official publications including Annual reports.

The RSIPF Professional Standards and Internal Investigations Unit monitors police discipline and performance.

The Solomon Islands Government has approved the staged, limited rearmament of the RSIPF including the Police Response Unit, Close Personal Protection Unit and Aviation Policing.

Under the Police Act 2013, the RSIPF is also responsible for Fire services and maintains a Fire Service in Honiara and the major provincial capitals.

Ranks

Maritime Department 
The RSIPF Maritime Department provides the RSIPF's maritime capability and conducts operational patrols and patrols of the Exclusive Economic Zone (EEZ) and Solomon Islands Borders for fisheries, immigration and national security purposes.  RSIPF Maritime operates the one Pacific-class patrol boat, RSIPV Auki (04), and the new Guardian-class patrol boat RSIPV Gizo (05). The Gizo replaced the other Pacific-class patrol boat, RSIPV Lata (03), when it was commissioned on 19 December 2019, and when the second Guardian-class vessel enters service in 2022, the Auki will presumably also be replaced and disposed of.

Australia started delivering Guardian class patrol vessels to replace the Pacific class vessels in 2018.  Australia committed to provide two new vessels to replace the RSIPF vessels.  The then Police Commissioner Matthew Varley announced, on January 26, 2019, that expansion of the Police Force's mooring space, to accommodate the larger Guardian class vessels, would be undertaken in 2019.

In 2020 and 2021, Australia provided a squadron of several  in-shore patrol craft.

The MD acts as the SI's defacto navy.

List of RSIPF Commissioners

References

External links
 Royal Solomon Islands Police Force
 State.gov
 Isiservicescorp.com
 Solomonstarnews.com
 Radionz.co.nz
 theislandsun.com

Law of the Solomon Islands
Solomon